The siege of Torgau (18 October 1813 – 10 January 1814) was a siege in the War of the Sixth Coalition. The French-held fortress on the Elbe was besieged by Prussian troops and forced to surrender.

Background
The fortress of Torgau was built on both sides of the Elbe as a royal Saxon main arsenal based on a design by Ernst Ludwig von Aster. In the spring of 1813 the French moved into the position. After the Battle of Dennewitz it covered the retreat of the French. During the Armistice of Pläswitz, provisions were insufficiently available to protect the Middle Elbe and to enable offensives against the Prussian heartland.

Siege
After the Battle of Leipzig, the fortress was besieged by the IV Army Corps with around 23,000 men under Bogislav Friedrich Emanuel von Tauentzien. The French trains and the civil servants fled to the fortress, so that the garrison strength grew from 6,000 to 30,000 men. In addition there were around 11,000 wounded in the hospitals. The French garrison commander Louis, comte de Narbonne-Lara died of typhus on 17 November.

After heavy bombardments, the weakened garrison under General Adrien Jean-Baptiste du Bosc surrendered unconditionally on 23 December, with about 7,200 men being taken prisoner on 10 January 1814 and 2,400 remaining in the hospitals.

Notes

References

External links
 

Battles of the War of the Sixth Coalition
Sieges of the Napoleonic Wars
Sieges involving France
Sieges involving Germany
Sieges involving Prussia
Conflicts in 1813
Conflicts in 1814
1813 in Saxony
Siege